Garba may refer to:

 Garba (dance), a form of dance originating from Gujarat, India

People
Ahmed Garba (born 1980), Nigerian football striker
Bala Garba (born 1974), Nigerian football coach
Binta Masi Garba (born 1967), Nigerian politician and businesswoman
Hamsou Garba (born 1958), Nigerien singer
Harouna Garba (born 1986), Nigerian track hurdler
Ibrahim Garba, Nigerian university vice-chancellor
Idris Garba (born 1947), military governor of Kano State, Nigeria
Issoufou Boubacar Garba (born 1990), Nigerien football player
Joseph Nanven Garba (1943–2002), Nigerian Foreign Minister, President of the United Nations General Assembly
Manu Garba (born 1965), Nigerian football manager
Mario Garba (born 1977), Croatian football player
Rufai Garba, military governor of Anambra State, Nigeria
Sam Garba (1948–1978), Nigerian football player
Seyni Garba, Nigerien army general
Yohannan Garba (fl. 691–693), anti-patriarch of the Church of the East

Places
Garba, Central African Republic
Garba, Sichuan
 Garba, the Hungarian name for Gurba village, Șicula Commune, Arad County, Romania
Garba Chowk, a square in Bhat, Daskroi, Gujarat
 Garba (see), a Roman Catholic titular bishopric in modern Algeria

See also
Garbha (disambiguation)